Çağdaş Terzi (born 23 October 1989), better known by his stage name Contra, is a Turkish rapper and songwriter. He began his musical career with a single named "Ölü". In 2017 he released another single named "Ters Yön", however its beat was  the same as Aynur Aydın's single "Bi' Dakika" and the song was removed from all digital platforms, including YouTube. In 2019 he released his new single, titled "Zebani", in which he criticized journalist Yılmaz Özdil.

Discography
Studio albums
 Zaman Alevi (2006)
 Eleştiri (ft. Orking) (2008)
 Clicktape (ft. Sensei) (2008)
 ContraVolta (2008)
 Understar (2009)
 Personel harici giremez (ft. İtaat) (2010)
 Siyah (2011)
 İnanılmaza Doğru (2011)
 İnanılmaz (Unbelievable) (2012)
 Hitz En Şitz (2015)
 YERDEN YÜKSEK (ft. Anıl Piyancı) (2018)

Singles
 "Ölü" (2012)
 "Zamanda Yolculuk" (2012)
 "Ötesi" (2013)
 "Çivi"  (2015)
 "Zyon"  (2015)
 "Tehlikeli" (2015)
 "Efsane" (2015)
 "Böyle" (ft. Mister Gang, Orking) (2016)
 "Mahkum" (2016)
 "Kibir"  (2018)
 "Tavşan" (ft. Anıl Piyancı) (2018)
 "Zebani" (2019)
 "Hayırlar Ola" (2019)
 "Bir Yana" (2019)
 "kan sahibi" (2020)
 "kıvılcım" (2020)
 "RUH" (ft. Kamufle, Mali Green) (2020)
 "Boş" (ft. Anıl Piyancı, Maho G) (2020)
 "Islak Kum" (2020)
 "GİTTİN GİDELİ" (ft. Timu322) (2021)
 "Sushi" (ft. Anıl Piyancı) (2021)
 "Ücra" (ft. Emrah Karakuyu) (2021)
 "Duvar" (ft. Timu322 & Cenko) (2021)
 "Buz Sarkıtı" (ft. Konuya Fransız) (2021)
 "Bi' Şarkı" (ft. Tanerman) (2021)
 "Afaki" (2022)
 "Dilenci Yrraa" (2022)
 "Benden Bil" (2022)

References

External links 

1989 births
Living people
Turkish rappers
Musicians from Istanbul
21st-century Turkish singers
21st-century Turkish male singers
Turkish lyricists
Turkish-language singers